The Gulfstream American GA-7 Cougar is an American all-metal, 4-seat, twin-engined light aircraft. The Cougar was a twin-engine development of the Gulfstream American AA-5B Tiger and traces its lineage to the AA-1 Yankee Clipper and the Bede BD-1.

Development 
As a development of the company's single-engined designs, Grumman American developed a twin-engined version, designated the GA-7 which it named the Cougar, in keeping with the existing Lynx, Cheetah and Tiger names for aircraft in the company's line. The prototype Cougar with two  Lycoming O-320 engines first flew on the 29 December 1974. The prototype had a sliding canopy but this was soon changed to a starboard side door on the production aircraft. With other rework required the production prototype did not fly until 14 January 1977.

Before production started the company was taken over on 1 September 1978 by American Jet Industries, who changed the company name to Gulfstream American. Production of the Cougar ran for only two model years, 1978 and 1979, before production was halted. Just 115 Cougars were delivered.

In 1995 the type certificate for the GA-7 was sold to SOCATA of France who intended to produce the aircraft as the TB 320 Tangara for the training market. It was also to develop a variant with two Lycoming O-360-A1G6 engines of  each and a re-designed cockpit, it was designated the TB 360. The first Tangara was a modified Cougar, had  engines and first flew in mid-1996. The complete Tangara prototype was also a converted Cougar and had the  engines. It first flew in February 1997. After delays in getting the type certified SOCATA announced at the end of 1999 that it had delayed indefinitely plans to certify the type.

On 23 May 2019 the type certificate was transferred by SOCATA to the Cougar Aircraft Corporation in the United States.

Design 
The Cougar is a twin-engined low-wing cantilever monoplane using a honeycomb and bonded metal construction that is the hallmark of the line since the BD-1. The prototype's single spar wing was upgraded to a double-spar configuration and this allowed a wet wing.

It was certified under US FAR Part 23 on 22 September 1977.

Variants
GA7 Cougar
 version designed by Grumman American and produced by Gulfstream American 1978-79. 115 built.
TB 320 Tangara
Restarted production of the  version by SOCATA, two modified Cougars were converted to Tangara prototypes 1996-97, production was never started.
TB 360 Tangara
Re-designed variant from SOCATA with  O-360 engines, one prototype, a modified Cougar, was first flown in 1997, never entered production.

Specifications (Gulfstream American GA-7 Cougar)

See also

References

External links
 

Cougar
TB 320
1970s United States civil utility aircraft
Low-wing aircraft
Aircraft first flown in 1974
Twin piston-engined tractor aircraft